The Al Ahram-Jolie Ville Sharm El Sheikh Challenge was a golf tournament on the Challenge Tour in 2004. It was played at Jolie Ville Golf Resort in Sharm el-Sheikh, Egypt.

Winners

References

External links
Coverage on the Challenge Tour's official site

Former Challenge Tour events
Golf tournaments in Egypt
2004 in Egyptian sport